Ann Harriet Hughes (1852 – 25 April 1910) was a Welsh language novelist, under the pen-name Gwyneth Vaughan.

Life

Ann Harriet Hughes was born at Talsarnau in Merionethshire, the daughter of a miller, and had a basic school education at Llandecwyn.  
In 1876 she married John Hughes Jones, a doctor in Clwt-y-bont, Caernarvon; they later dropped the "Jones" part of their surname.  
They lived in London and later in Treherbert and Clwt-y-bont.  
Left to bring up four children on her husband's death in 1902, she moved to Bangor, Gwynedd, and took up writing as a career.

Hughes completed three novels, and a left a fourth unfinished work. 
She also edited Welsh versions of three of the works of the Scottish evangelist Henry Drummond and wrote verse in Welsh. 
She edited the woman's page in the Welsh Weekly (1892), Yr Eryr (1894–95) Y Cymro (1906–07).

Death

Ann Harriet Hughes died on 25 April 1910 at Pwllheli.
She was buried in the graveyard of the Llanfihangel-y-traethau church.

Works

O Gorlannau'r Defaid (1905) 
Plant y Gorthrwm (1908)
Cysgodau y Blynyddoedd Gynt (1908) 
Troad y Rhod (unfinished; partly published in the periodical Y Brython, 1909).

References

Sources

1852 births
1910 deaths
19th-century Welsh people
19th-century Welsh women
20th-century Welsh novelists
20th-century Welsh women writers
People from Merionethshire
Welsh women novelists
Welsh-language novelists
Pseudonymous women writers
20th-century pseudonymous writers